The 1917 Saint Mary's Saints football team was an American football team that represented Saint Mary's College of California during the 1917 college football season.  The team compiled an 8–1–1 record, shut out seven of ten opponents, and outscored all opponents by a combined total of 199 to 46. The sole loss was to the undefeated Mare Island Marines team that also won the 1918 Rose Bowl. With victories over both USC and California, the Saint Mary's team was proclaimed in the press as the California college champion.

Prior to 1917, Saint Mary's College had not been known as a football power. As of 1917, the school, located on Broadway in Oakland, California, had only 250 students with an average age of 16, and the Oakland Tribune opined that "only about 20 of the students are football material."

In July 1917, Saint Mary's College hired Russell T. Wilson as its new football coach. Wilson had previously been associated with Whittier College.

Schedule

References

Saint Mary's
Saint Mary's Gaels football seasons
Saint Mary's Saints football